Bernards Township is a township in Somerset County, in the U.S. state of New Jersey. The township is a bedroom suburb of New York City in the much larger New York metropolitan area, located within the Raritan Valley region. As of the 2020 United States census, the township's population was 27,830, an increase of 1,178 (+4.4%) from the 2010 census count of 26,652, reflecting an increase of 2,077 (+8.5%) from the 24,575 counted in the 2000 census.

Bernards Township was originally formed by royal charter on May 24, 1760, as Bernardston Township from remaining portions of Northern precinct. It was incorporated as Bernards Township by an act of the New Jersey Legislature on February 21, 1798, as one of New Jersey's initial group of 104 townships. Portions of the township were taken to form Warren Township (March 5, 1806), Far Hills (April 7, 1921) and Bernardsville (March 6, 1924). Bernards Township celebrated its 250th charter anniversary on May 24, 2010.

The township was named for Sir Francis Bernard, 1st Baronet, who served as governor of the Province of New Jersey.

Geography
According to the United States Census Bureau, the township had a total area of 24.33 square miles (63.01 km2), including 24.20 square miles (62.68 km2) of land and 0.13 square miles (0.33 km2) of water (0.52%).

The township is roughly bounded by the Second Watchung Mountain in the southwest, the Dead River swamp on the south, the Great Swamp National Wildlife Refuge, Passaic River, and Millington Gorge in the east.

Unincorporated communities, localities and place names located partially or completely within the township include Basking Ridge, Franklin Corners, Green Knoll, Hardscrabble, Liberty Corner, Lyons, Madisonville, Mount Horeb, Somerset Mills, State Park, Stone House and White Bridge. Martinsville is an unincorporated area in Bridgewater Township, whose 08836 ZIP Code also covers portions of Bernards Township.

The township borders Bedminster Township and Far Hills to the west, Bernardsville to the northwest, Bridgewater Township to the southwest, and Warren Township to the southeast in Somerset County and Harding Township to the northeast and Long Hill to the east in Morris County.

Demographics

2010 census

The Census Bureau's 2006–2010 American Community Survey showed that (in 2010 inflation-adjusted dollars) median household income was $123,285 (with a margin of error of +/− $7,030) and the median family income was $153,906 (+/− $14,565). Males had a median income of $123,390 (+/− $9,621) versus $86,272 (+/− $9,195) for females. The per capita income for the borough was $67,809 (+/− $4,972). About 2.1% of families and 2.9% of the population were below the poverty line, including 1.3% of those under age 18 and 8.0% of those age 65 or over.

2000 census
At the 2000 United States census there were 24,575 people, 9,242 households and 6,487 families residing in the township.  The population density was 1,023.8 per square mile (395.4/km2). There were 9,485 housing units at an average density of 395.1 per square mile (152.6/km2). The racial makeup of the township was 89.20% White, 1.44% African American, 0.05% Native American, 7.85% Asian, 0.01% Pacific Islander, 0.40% from other races, and 1.05% from two or more races. Hispanic or Latino people of any race were 2.63% of the population.

There were 9,242 households, of which 37.6% had children under the age of 18 living with them, 63.0% were married couples living together, 5.8% had a female householder with no husband present, and 29.8% were non-families. 26.4% of all households were made up of individuals, and 9.2% had someone living alone who was 65 years of age or older. The average household size was 2.58 and the average family size was 3.17.

Age distribution was 27.7% under the age of 18, 3.2% from 18 to 24, 31.2% from 25 to 44, 25.5% from 45 to 64, and 12.5% who were 65 years of age or older. The median age was 39 years. For every 100 females, there were 94.6 males. For every 100 females age 18 and over, there were 90.0 males.

The median income for a household in the township was $107,204, and the median income for a family was $135,806. Males had a median income of $95,758 versus $60,865 for females. The per capita income for the township was $56,521. About 0.6% of families and 1.3% of the population were below the poverty line, including 1.2% of those under age 18 and 2.9% of those age 65 or over.

Economy
The headquarters of Barnes & Noble College Booksellers, Fedders, Hitachi Power Systems USA and Verizon Wireless are located in the township. Verizon Communications, which maintains its world headquarters in New York City, has located operations of its major business units in buildings that were formerly AT&T's world headquarters.

Government

Local government 
Bernards Township operates under the Township form of New Jersey municipal government, one of 141 municipalities (of the 564) statewide that use this form, the second-most commonly used form of government in the state. The Township Committee has five members, who are elected directly by the voters at-large in partisan elections to serve three-year terms of office on a staggered basis, with either one or two seats coming up for election each year as part of the November general election in a three-year cycle. At an annual reorganization meeting held during the first week of January, the Township Committee selects one of its members to serve as Mayor and another as Deputy Mayor.

, members of the Bernards Township Committee are Mayor James Baldassare Jr. (R, term on committee ends December 31, 2023; term as mayor ends 2022), Deputy Mayor Andrew J. McNally (R, term on committee ends 2024; term as deputy mayor ends 2022), Jennifer L. Asay (R, 2024), Janice M. Fields (R, 2022) and Kathleen M. Grochala (R, 2023).

Township Flag
Bernards Township is one of only a handful of townships in New Jersey to have their own designated flag. Four rectangles of gold and red that stand for the four communities of which Bernards is composed: Basking Ridge, Liberty Corner, Lyons and West Millington. Bound in white, symbolic of purity and truth, the red is for the blood of life and the gold is for a prosperous and flourishing community. White is for purity. Two oak leaves adorning the red-gold field represent the township's old oak tree, a symbol of strength, sturdiness and character. The twin oak leaves also stand for each of the township's 200 years in existence.

Federal, state and county representation 
Bernards Township is located in the 7th Congressional District and is part of New Jersey's 21st state legislative district. Prior to the 2011 reapportionment following the 2010 Census, Bernards Township had been in the 16th state legislative district.

 

Somerset County is governed by a five-member Board of County Commissioners, whose members are elected at-large to three-year terms of office on a staggered basis, with one or two seats coming up for election each year. At an annual reorganization meeting held on the first Friday of January, the board selects a Director and Deputy Director from among its members. , Somerset County's County Commissioners are
Director Shanel Robinson (D, Franklin Township, term as commissioner ends December 31, 2024; term as director ends 2022),
Deputy Director Melonie Marano (D, Green Brook Township, term as commissioner and as deputy director ends 2022),
Paul Drake (D, Hillsborough Township, 2023),
Douglas Singleterry (D, North Plainfield, 2023) and 
Sara Sooy (D, Basking Ridge in Bernards Township, 2024).
Pursuant to Article VII Section II of the New Jersey State Constitution, each county in New Jersey is required to have three elected administrative officials known as constitutional officers. These officers are the County Clerk and County Surrogate (both elected for five-year terms of office) and the County Sheriff (elected for a three-year term). Constitutional officers, elected on a countywide basis are 
County Clerk Steve Peter (D, Somerville, 2022),
Sheriff Darrin Russo (D, Franklin Township, 2022) and 
Surrogate Bernice "Tina" Jalloh (D, Franklin Township, 2025)

Elections
As of March 23, 2011, there were a total of 18,377 registered voters in Bernards Township, of which 3,544 (19.3% vs. 26.0% countywide) were registered as Democrats, 7,019 (38.2% vs. 25.7%) were registered as Republicans and 7,803 (42.5% vs. 48.2%) were registered as Unaffiliated. There were 11 voters registered to as Libertarians or Greens. Among the township's 2010 Census population, 69.0% (vs. 60.4% in Somerset County) were registered to vote, including 96.9% of those ages 18 and over (vs. 80.4% countywide).

In the 2012 presidential election, Republican Mitt Romney received 59.2% of the vote (7,879 cast), ahead of Democrat Barack Obama with 40.1% (5,338 votes), and other candidates with 0.8% (101 votes), among the 13,383 ballots cast by the township's 19,555 registered voters (65 ballots were spoiled), for a turnout of 68.4%. In the 2008 presidential election, Republican John McCain received 8,078 votes here (56.1% vs. 46.1% countywide), ahead of Democrat Barack Obama with 6,143 votes (42.6% vs. 52.1%) and other candidates with 99 votes (0.7% vs. 1.1%), among the 14,405 ballots cast by the township's 18,039 registered voters, for a turnout of 79.9% (vs. 78.7% in Somerset County). In the 2004 presidential election, Republican George W. Bush received 8,364 votes here (60.6% vs. 51.5% countywide), ahead of Democrat John Kerry with 5,317 votes (38.5% vs. 47.2%) and other candidates with 84 votes (0.6% vs. 0.9%), among the 13,812 ballots cast by the township's 16,534 registered voters, for a turnout of 83.5% (vs. 81.7% in the whole county).

In the 2013 gubernatorial election, Republican Chris Christie received 77.1% of the vote (6,505 cast), ahead of Democrat Barbara Buono with 21.7% (1,829 votes), and other candidates with 1.2% (105 votes), among the 8,547 ballots cast by the township's 19,701 registered voters (108 ballots were spoiled), for a turnout of 43.4%. In the 2009 gubernatorial election, Republican Chris Christie received 6,124 votes here (59.5% vs. 55.8% countywide), ahead of Democrat Jon Corzine with 2,639 votes (25.6% vs. 34.1%), Independent Chris Daggett with 1,427 votes (13.9% vs. 8.7%) and other candidates with 33 votes (0.3% vs. 0.7%), among the 10,293 ballots cast by the township's 18,244 registered voters, yielding a 56.4% turnout (vs. 52.5% in the county).

Education
Students in public school for pre-kindergarten through twelfth grade are served by the Bernards Township School District. As of the 2020–21 school year, the district, comprised of six schools, had an enrollment of 4,874 students and 456.1 classroom teachers (on an FTE basis), for a student–teacher ratio of 10.7:1. Schools in the district (with 2020–21 enrollment data from the National Center for Education Statistics) are 
Cedar Hill Elementary School with 483 students in grades K-5, 
Liberty Corner Elementary School with 466 students in grades K-5, 
Mount Prospect Elementary School with 507 students in grades PreK-5, 
Oak Street Elementary School with 406 students in grades K-5, 
William Annin Middle School with 1,201 students in grades 6-8 and 
Ridge High School with 1,794 students in grades 9-12. The district offers its Integrated Preschool Program for children on the autism spectrum, utilizing the principles of applied behavior analysis.

During the 2009–10 school year, Ridge High School was awarded the National Blue Ribbon School Award of Excellence by the United States Department of Education, the highest award an American school can receive. The school had also won the award for the 1986–1987 school year. Mount Prospect Elementary School was one of 11 in the state to be recognized in 2014 by the United States Department of Education's National Blue Ribbon Schools Program. In 2015, Liberty Corner School was one of 15 schools in New Jersey, and one of nine public schools, recognized as a National Blue Ribbon School in the exemplary high performing category.

Ridge High School was ranked 194th, the second-highest in New Jersey, in Newsweek magazine's 2010 rankings of America's Best High Schools. The school was the 9th-ranked public high school in New Jersey out of 328 schools statewide, in New Jersey Monthly magazine's September 2010 cover story on the state's "Top Public High Schools", after being ranked 12th in 2010 out of 322 schools.  The Ridge High School was ranked 37th best in America in 2015 by Newsweek.

Pingry School, a private coeducational college preparatory day school, has its upper campus, for grades 6 to 12, located in Basking Ridge (prior to 2013 the campus was listed as being located in Martinsville).

Saint James School is a parochial elementary school for students in preschool through eighth grade that operates under the supervision of the Roman Catholic Diocese of Metuchen.

Township events

Bernards Township Day is held annually on May 24 as a day of community service and pride where residents give back to the community by volunteering to perform a community service activity or to demonstrate their pride by flying the Bernards Township flag.

Bernards Township Charter Day is typically held the third Saturday in May. It is a street fair organized by the Bernards Township Parks and Recreation Department. The program includes events on the town green in Basking Ridge Village to the nearby Oak Street Elementary School field.

Transportation

Roads and highways

Major roads serving Bernards Township include Interstate 78, Interstate 287 and U.S. Route 202.

Public transportation
NJ Transit train service is available at the Basking Ridge station and Lyons station on the Gladstone Branch, providing service between Gladstone and Hoboken Terminal.

NJ Transit provides local bus service on the MCM8 route.

Lakeland Bus Lines provides Route 78 rush-hour service from Bedminster to the Port Authority Bus Terminal in Midtown Manhattan.

Points of interest
 Alward Farmhouse
 Basking Ridge Presbyterian Church and Cemetery – listed on the National Register of Historic Places
 The Brick Academy – A restoration of what was known as the Basking Ridge Classical School, a prep school for those hoping to attend Princeton University. The Brick Academy is the current home of the Historical Society of the Somerset Hills.
 Town Hall and Astor Estate
 Franklin Corners Historic District – Includes Van Dorn's Mill and the Grain House Restaurant, listed on the NRHP
 Liberty Corner Village
 Lyons VA Medical Center – A Veterans Administration Hospital with Classical Revival style brick buildings, listed on the NRHP
 The Devil's Tree – A solitary oak tree in a field off Mountain Road in the southern corner of the township that has been subject of several stories in Weird NJ magazine
 Kennedy–Martin–Stelle Farmstead – Farmstead Arts Center, listed on the NRHP
 Boudinot–Southard Farmstead – Also known as the Ross Farm, listed on the NRHP
 Southard Park
 Mountain Park
 USGA Museum

Volunteer Effort -  Terrebonne Parish 
In 2005, after Hurricane Katrina and Hurricane Rita, which had a devastating effect on the Greater New Orleans area, the Bernards Township Regional Chamber of Commerce, under the leadership of former Mayor Albert LiCata, organized and sent truckloads of supplies to assist residents of Houma, Louisiana. In 2007, the Parish returned the favor by sending the Terrebonne High School Marching band on a 26-hour bus ride to the Bernards Township Chamber's Holiday Parade to march at their event and perform a Christmas concert for the public at a local church.

Justice Department lawsuit 
On November 22, 2016, the United States Department of Justice filed a lawsuit against Bernards Township, alleging "that the township violated the Religious Land Use and Institutionalized Persons Act (RLUIPA) when it denied zoning approval to allow the Islamic Society of Basking Ridge to build a mosque on land it owns."

In January 2017 the township hired Trenton-based Burton Trent Public Affairs to help manage the negative publicity associated with the Justice Department's allegations.  The contract was reportedly worth $45,000.

Notable people

People who were born in, residents of, or otherwise closely associated with Bernards Township include:

 William Alexander, Lord Stirling (1726–1783), Continental Army major general during the American Revolutionary War
 John Jacob Astor VI (1912–1992), socialite, shipping businessman and member of the Astor family.
 J. C. Chandor (born 1974), Academy Award-nominated writer/director of the 2011 film Margin Call
 Chris Daggett (born 1950), President and CEO of the Geraldine R. Dodge Foundation who ran as an independent candidate in the 2009 New Jersey gubernatorial election
 Scott Fischer (1955–1996), climber and guide who was the first American to climb Lhotse, the fourth-highest mountain in the world, who died during an attempt to climb Mount Everest in the 1996 Everest Disaster
 Patricia Lee Gauch (born 1934), author of over 30 works of children's literature; inducted into the New Jersey Literary Hall of Fame in 1993
 Jarryd Goldberg (born 1985), former professional soccer player who played for Miami FC
 Jeff Grace, comedian, screenwriter, film producer, film director and actor; directed Folk Hero & Funny Guy
 Jon Gutwillig (born 1974), guitarist of the Disco Biscuits
 Tobin Heath (born 1988), soccer player and member of the United States women's national team who won a gold medal as youngest member of the US team in the 2008 Olympics
 Vincent R. Kramer (1918–2001), United States Marine Corps colonel who was a guerrilla warfare expert and was awarded the Navy Cross during the Korean War
 Peter Kuhn (1955–2009), race car driver who won both the USAC and SCCA Formula Super Vee championships in 1980
 George Ludlow Lee Sr. (1901–1966), chairman of the board of Red Devil, Inc.
 Philip Lindsley (1786–1855), Presbyterian minister, educator, and classicist; acting president of the College of New Jersey (now Princeton University), 1822–1824
 Kelly-Anne Lyons (born 1985), actress, television presenter, writer and model, who starred  in the BBC comedy Dick and Dom's Funny Business
 Max Mahoney (born 1998, class of 2016), professional basketball player for VfL Kirchheim Knights of the ProA
 Page McConnell (born 1963), keyboardist best known for his work with the rock band Phish
 Robert E. Mulcahy III (born 1932), athletic director at Rutgers University
 Akshay Nanavati (born 1984), United States Marine Corps veteran, speaker, entrepreneur, ultra runner and author of Fearvana
 Jasbir Puar (born 1967), queer theorist, Professor of Women and Gender Studies at Rutgers University and author of The Right to Maim
 J. Robert Sims (born ), chemical / mechanical engineer and inventor, who served as president of the American Society of Mechanical Engineers
 Samuel Lewis Southard (1787–1842), U.S. Senator, Secretary of the Navy, and the 10th Governor of New Jersey
 Mike Tannenbaum (born 1969), former general manager of the New York Jets
 LaDainian Tomlinson (born 1979), former NFL running back who played for the New York Jets
 Kelly Williford (born 1994), professional tennis player
 Zip the Pinhead (–1926), turn-of-the-century sideshow performer who was born in Liberty Corner as William Henry Johnson

References

External links

 Bernards Township official website
 The Royal Governor Sir Francis Bernard, Esq.
 History of the Bernards Township Flag
 The Mr. Local History Project – Bernards Township
 Bernards Township Historian website
 Franklin Corners Historic District

 
1760 establishments in New Jersey
Populated places established in 1760
Township form of New Jersey government
Townships in Somerset County, New Jersey